Fan Jian ( 250s–263), courtesy name Changyuan, was a Chinese politician of the state of Shu Han in the late Three Kingdoms period. He served briefly in the state of Cao Wei after the fall of Shu in 263.

Life
Fan Jian was from Yiyang Commandery, which is around present-day Zaoyang, Hubei. He served as an official in the state of Shu Han in the Three Kingdoms period. The highest positions he reached in the Shu government were Palace Attendant and Prefect of the Masters of Writing. Along with Zhuge Zhan and Dong Jue, Fan Jian was one of the leading figures in the Shu government in the 250s and 260s. Despite his best efforts, he was unable to curb the negative influence of Huang Hao, an imperial eunuch highly favoured by the Shu emperor Liu Shan. After the fall of Shu in 263, Fan Jian served under Shu's rival state Cao Wei and travelled to the Wei imperial capital, Luoyang. He first served as an Army Adviser to the Chancellor of State and was subsequently given the additional appointment of a Regular Mounted Attendant. The Wei government sent him back to the former Shu territories to comfort the people. He was later promoted to the position of an Official Who Concurrently Serves in the Palace.

See also
 Lists of people of the Three Kingdoms

References

 Chen, Shou (3rd century). Records of the Three Kingdoms (Sanguozhi).
 Pei, Songzhi (5th century). Annotations to Records of the Three Kingdoms (Sanguozhi zhu).

2nd-century births
Year of death unknown
Cao Wei politicians
Politicians from Hubei
Shu Han politicians